The 2018 FIBA 3x3 World Cup, hosted by the Philippines, was an international 3x3 basketball event that featured separate competitions for men's and women's national teams. The tournament ran between 8 and 12 June 2018 in Bocaue, Bulacan, just north of Manila. It is co-organized by FIBA.

Background

It was announced on 5 December 2017 that the tournament would be held at the Philippine Arena in Bocaue, Bulacan, which is just north of Metro Manila. Since the final would be held on Philippine Independence Day, cultural events were also planned alongside the tournament proper. The Philippine Arena will also be used for the 2023 FIBA Basketball World Cup.

The tournament was officially launched on 18 January 2018 at the Bonifacio High Street in Taguig. The official logo for the event was also unveiled during the ceremony.

Medalists

Participating teams
The FIBA 3x3 Federation Ranking on 17 January 2018 was used as basis to determine the participating FIBA member associations. The hosts, the Philippines, qualified automatically for both the men's and women's events, while the defending champions, Serbia for men's and Russia for women's, also qualified automatically. The top 20 teams in the men's and women's Federation Rankings qualified with the following conditions: a maximum of 10 teams from a single continent could qualify and at least 30 FIBA member associations must participate. The 40 qualifying teams (20 each for the men's and women's tournaments) had to confirm their participation by 30 November 2017. FIBA confirmed the participation of 37 member associations on 18 January 2018.

Main tournaments

Men

Women

Individual contests

Dunk contest

 (1)
 (1)
 (1)
 (2)
 (2)

Skills contest

Shoot-out contest

 (1)
 (1)
 (1)
 (1)
 (1)
 (1)
 (1)
 (1)
 (1)
 (1)
 (2)
 (1)
 (1)
 (1)
 (1)
 (1)
 (1)
 (1)
 (1)
 (1)
 (1)
 (1)
 (2)
 (1)
 (1)
 (1)
 (1)
 (1)
 (2)
 (1)
 (1)
 (1)
 (1)

References

External links

 
2018
2018–19 in Philippine basketball
FIBA 3x3 World Cup
2018
Sports in Bulacan
3x3 basketball in the Philippines
June 2018 sports events in the Philippines